The Coeur d'Alene Federal Building is a historic building built in 1927 in Coeur d'Alene, Idaho.  It was listed on the National Register of Historic Places in 1977.

It is a three-story cast stone and brick Federal building, built in Adamesque style.  It has round arched openings in its first story, cast stone quoins, and a terra cotta portico.  Of federal buildings in the state, it was regarded as a "fine structure, one of the most elegant in Idaho."

References

Federal buildings in the United States
Government buildings on the National Register of Historic Places in Idaho
Federal architecture in Idaho
Buildings and structures completed in 1927
Kootenai County, Idaho